Southmoreland High School is located in East Huntingdon Township, Westmoreland County, Pennsylvania, 40 miles southeast of downtown Pittsburgh. It serves grades 9–12. The school is part of the Southmoreland School District, which covers East Huntington Township, Ruffs Dale, Alverton, Tarrs, Scottdale, Everson, and parts of Buckeye. The school is headed by Principal Mr. Daniel Krofcheck and Assistant Principal Mrs. Tracey Kuchar.

Advanced Placement courses are available for enrollment in the subjects of Calculus (AB), Chemistry, Physics 1, Physics 2, Biology, English Language and Composition, English Literature and Composition, United States Government and Politics, French Language and Culture, Spanish Language and Culture, Music Theory and Statistics.

Dual enrollment courses are available in the following subjects: English Literature, American Politics, Physics 1, and Calculus 1.

References

 

Education in Westmoreland County, Pennsylvania
Public high schools in Pennsylvania